Chapa may refer to:

 Čhápa, a mythological rodent
 Chapa (given name), a feminine given name
 Chapa (surname), a surname
 Chapa dynasty, a Rajput clan also called Chawda

See also

 Chapas
 Chappa